Marcy Kahan (born 4 July) is a British playwright and radio dramatist, who is half-Canadian and half-American. She is a prolific author of urbane comedies for the BBC. She was born in Montreal, educated at Somerville College, Oxford and trained in theatre in Paris with the Lecoq School teachers, Philippe Gaulier and Monika Pagneux. She was one of the writers of BBC Radio 4's soap opera Citizens.

Selected works

Theatre 
20 Cigarettes National Youth Theatre, Soho Theatre 2007
 Stage version of Nora Ephron's When Harry Met Sally ..., Theatre Royal Haymarket, 2005
 Goldberg Variations, Miranda Theatre, New York, 1999
 Intimate Memoirs of an Irish Taxidermist, Edinburgh and Donmar Theatre, 1986 Perrier Award for Best Comedy

Screenplay
Antonia and Jane, BBC/Miramax, Gold Plaque Award for Best Original Screenplay, 1991 Chicago Film Festival

Press
Bomb Magazine — Michael Frayn by Marcy Kahan (issue 73, fall 2000)

Radio

Radio plays
Fusion Confidential BBC Radio 4, 24th October 2020
Born To Be Wilde: The Warhol Years BBC Radio 4, 17 December 2018 
Ninety Minutes With Stanislavski BBC Radio 3, 10 December 2017
Five Lessons - Series A Month of Maureen BBC Radio 4, 13 November 2017
Lunch: A Platonic Romantic Comedy - Series Five BBC Radio 4, 24–28 July 2017
Lunch: A Platonic Romantic Comedy - Series Four BBC Radio 4, 18–22 July 2016
Lunch: A Platonic Romantic Comedy - Series Three BBC Radio 4, 11–15 May 2015
Lunch: A Platonic Romantic Comedy - Series Two BBC Radio 4, 22–26 September 2014 2015 BBC Audio Drama Award for Best Scripted Comedy
Lunch: A Platonic Romantic Comedy - Series One BBC Radio 4, 15–19 July 2013
Mr Bridger's Orphan, BBC Radio 4, 15 Mar 2013
The Porlock Poisoner, BBC World Service, 13 Aug 2011
Incredibly Guilty, BBC Radio 4, 14 Jan 2011
Big In Samoa, BBC Radio 4, 1 Jan 2010
Life Complicated; Status Pending, BBC Radio 4, 7 Oct 2009
From Fact to Fiction: Artie & Zoe, BBC Radio 4, 4 May 2008
From Fact to Fiction: The Heebie Jeebies, BBC Radio 4, 20 December 2014
Nostrovia Fitzrovia: The Black Cat Murder Mystery, BBC World Service, 3 May 2008
The Playwright & The Grammarian, BBC Radio 4, 2 May 2008
Marvellous!, BBC World Service, 2007
The Noël Coward Quintet : Five detective comedies/spy thrillers featuring the British playwright Noël Coward: Design for Murder, 2000; Blithe Spy, 2002; A Bullet at Balmain's, 2003; Death at the Desert Inn, 2004; Our Man in Jamaica, 2007, BBC Radio 4
20 Cigarettes, BBC Radio 4, 2006
Object of Insane Desire, BBC World Service, 2006
Drop Dead Gorgeous, BBC World Service, Bronze Medal for Best Play, 2004 New York Radio Festival
The Non-Entity, BBC Radio 4, 2003
Killing Katerina, BBC World Service, 2001
The Uncertainty Principle, BBC World Service, 2001 Kurd Lasswitz Science Fiction Prize
The DJ Who Used To Be A Nun's Tale, BBC Radio 4, 2000
Victorville, BBC Radio 4, 1998
Salzburg in London, BBC World Service, 1997
Everybody Comes to Schicklgruber's, BBC Radio 4, 1997 Silver Sony Award
Purgatory, BBC Radio 3, 1991
The Transmogrification of Herbert Mellish, BBC Radio 4 1987
Viva, BBC Radio 4, 1986
One Last Final Fling, BBC Radio 4, 1985
The Contemplative Life, BBC Radio 3, 1985

Radio dramatisations
Madam, Will You Talk? by Mary Stewart, BBC Radio 4, 23 and 30 August 2020
Kitchen Confidential by Anthony Bourdain, BBC Radio 4, a 5-episode dramatisation, 22–26 May 2017
Look Who's Back? from the novel by Timur Vermes BBC Radio 4 27 September, 4 October 2015
The Corrections by Jonathan Franzen, BBC Radio 4, a 15-episode dramatisation, 5–23 January 2015*
Psmith in the City by P.G. Wodehouse, BBC Radio 4, 2008
Adventures of Huckleberry Finn, CBC/BBC co-production, 2002
The Man Who Came to Dinner by Moss Hart and George S Kaufman, BBC Radio 4, 25 December 2000
War & Peace (co-author: Mike Walker). Talkie Award for Best Drama, 1998
The Wizard of Oz , BBC Radio 4
The Railway Children, BBC Radio 4
Anne of Green Gables, BBC Radio 4
Little Women & Good Wives, BBC Radio 4, 1992–3

References

Sources
  Stephen Mangan & Marcy Kahan interview
 Radio 4's Lunch was a wise and witty feast for the senses
 Who will be the first woman on the moon?

External links 
BBC World Service – Meet the Writers
Represented by The Agency
Radio Plays

The Edge
 Royal Literary Fund Writing Fellowship]
 [2015 BBC Audio Drama Award Winners]
 [BBC The Corrections Homepage]

20th-century births
Living people
Year of birth missing (living people)
Alumni of Somerville College, Oxford
British dramatists and playwrights
British women dramatists and playwrights